

Places
Bache, Cheshire
Bache Peninsula, on Ellesmere Island, Canada

People
Richard Bache (1737–1811), an American Postmaster General
Sarah Franklin Bache (1743–1808), his wife and Benjamin Franklin's daughter
Benjamin Franklin Bache (journalist) (1769–1798), an American journalist, Richard and Sarah's son
Franklin Bache (1792-1864), American physician, chemist, professor and writer
Benjamin Franklin Bache (surgeon) (1801–1881), U.S. Navy surgeon, Richard Bache's grandson
Alexander Dallas Bache (1806–1867), an American physicist, Richard Bache's grandson
George M. Bache (1840–1896), an American naval officer, Richard Bache's grandson
Samuel Bache (1804–1876), an English Unitarian Minister
Francis Edward Bache (1833–1858), an English composer, Samuel Bache's son
Walter Bache (1842–1888), an English pianist and conductor, champion of Franz Liszt, Samuel Bache's son
Constance Bache (1846–1903), an English pianist and author, biographer of her brothers, Samuel Bache's daughter
Jules Bache (1861–1944), an American banker and philanthropist who built the company Bache & Co.
Kathryn Bache Miller (1896–1979), an American art collector and philanthropist, his daughter
Harold Bache (1889–1916), an English footballer (West Bromwich Albion) and cricketer
Joseph Bache (1880–1960), an English footballer (Aston Villa and England national football team)
David Bache (1925–1994), an English car designer, Joseph Bache's son
Alice K. Bache (1903–1977), an American philanthropist and art collector
Ida Wolden Bache (born 1973), Norwegian economist

Other
Bache & Co., a division of Prudential Financial
, an American warship
Share taxi, or bâché, in Francophone West Africa
Bach (New Zealand), a variant spelling of a local name for a holiday cottage
Che language and people, also known as Rukuba. (Nigeria)

See also
Bach (surname)